Hamedi is a surname. Notable people with the surname include:

Ebrahim Hamedi (born 1949), Iranian pop singer better known by his stage name Ebi
Niloofar Hamedi, Iranian journalist
Tareg Hamedi (born 1998), Saudi karateka

See also
Khaled K. El-Hamedi, Libyan humanitarian activist

Surnames of Iranian origin